Ultra is the ninth studio album by English electronic music band Depeche Mode, released on 14 April 1997 by Mute Records. It was the band's first album following the departure of Alan Wilder, who had become disillusioned with life in the band. Wilder's departure and lead singer Dave Gahan's drug problems, which culminated in a near-fatal overdose, had caused speculation that Depeche Mode was finished. Ultra was the first album the band recorded as a trio since A Broken Frame (1982); it was also their first where the band members were not involved with production, with these duties being handled by Tim Simenon of Bomb the Bass fame. Though not directly supported by a full-length tour, it was promoted via a brief series of concerts promoted as Ultra Parties.

The album debuted at number one on the UK Albums Chart and at number five on the US Billboard 200. By April 2006, it had sold 584,000 copies in the United States. In 1999, Ned Raggett ranked the album at number 50 on his list of the "Top 136 or So Albums of the Nineties". That same year, the annual Ultra Music Festival in Miami was named after the album by its co-founder Russell Faibisch, and acknowledging its influence on the Polish rock scene, Tylko Rock ranked it at number 71 on its list of the "100 Albums That Shook Polish Rock".

Background and composition
Lyrically, much of the album was inspired by the turmoil the band had faced throughout the 1990s. Martin Gore said that the opening track "Barrel of a Gun" is about realising that you do not have to fit someone else's view of the world. The demo version is similar in feel to the final version, although it was recreated from scratch. The drum pattern was cut up from a loop and re-sequenced, as Gore did not want to use an unedited drum loop, but also felt that loops can provide an "immediate atmosphere".

Musically, the band explored many sounds within the realms of alternative rock but with larger electronic and trip-hop influences. The band also felt that they wanted to do something different since Alan Wilder had left the band. Tim Simenon served as the album's sole producer, who had previously created two remixes for the limited 12" release of the live version of "Everything Counts" with Mark Saunders. He had also been a large fan of the band's music as far back as their appearance on Some Bizzare Album in 1981. As Gore and Gahan were impressed with Gavin Friday's 1995 album Shag Tobacco, which he had produced, Daniel Miller arranged for him to meet with the band.

"Sister of Night", "Useless" and "Insight" were the first demos to have been written. The band played these demos to Simenon when they met, and despite their simplicity he was impressed. Upon hearing the demo of "It's No Good", he considered it to be a classic Depeche Mode song. While the project started out as a small set of songs, it eventually evolved into a full album.

Gahan continued to struggle with his heroin addiction during the early months of the album's production. He rarely turned up to scheduled sessions, and when he did, it would take weeks to get any vocals recorded; one six-week session at Electric Lady in New York produced just one usable vocal (for "Sister of Night"), and even that was pieced together from multiple takes. Gore was forced to contemplate breaking the band up and considered releasing the songs he had written as a solo album. In mid-1996, after his near-fatal overdose, Gahan entered a court-ordered drug rehabilitation program to battle his addiction to cocaine and heroin. Recording sessions continued after he came out of rehab; according to Simenon, he sung "Barrel of a Gun" as if nothing had happened.

Wilder himself commented on the album discussing his feelings towards his departure:

'I can't hear it in the same way as a record I was involved with, but I certainly don't feel a yearning to be involved again, and I've no regrets about leaving at all. The album is difficult for me to comment on, though I do have something of a stock answer, which is: you can probably work out what I think about it by listening to Unsound Methods and then Ultra, because the two records tell you everything you need to know about what the musical relationship was between myself and Martin. It's almost as if we've gone to the two extremes of what we were when we were together. What the band had before was a combination of those extremes.'

2007 re-release
On 2 October 2007 (3 October in North America), Ultra was re-released as a two-disc set, along with Exciter, completing the Depeche Mode collector's edition catalog. The first disc is a remastered version of the original album, on a SACD/CD hybrid (except in the United States, where it is a CD only). The second disc is a DVD which features the album in DTS 5.1, Dolby Digital 5.1 and PCM Stereo. The B-sides from the album's singles can be listened to as well, including the standalone single "Only When I Lose Myself" and its B-sides. Like the other albums, there is a documentary on the making of Ultra titled Depeche Mode 95–98 (Oh Well, That's the End of the Band...), the subtitle of which comes from Gore's thoughts about Wilder's departure. The documentary begins with discussion from all parties of Wilder's departure before moving on to early album sessions despite Dave Gahan's drug issues present. Eventually, it moves on to Gahan's "death" and rehab. The documentary then covers the recording of Ultra and ends with a discussion on The Singles 86>98 and its corresponding singles tour. The whole band is interviewed, along with Alan Wilder, Daniel Miller, producer Tim Simenon, Mute executives, touring keyboardist Peter Gordeno, touring drummer Christian Eigner, Anton Corbijn and others. The remastered version of the album was released on vinyl 30 March 2007 in Germany and 1 October 2007 internationally.

Critical reception

Greg Kot of the Chicago Tribune stated the album "ranks with their best work... this veteran British combo has made a disc that should please their millions of followers and provide a few guilty pleasures for the rest of us." Jim Farber in his review for Entertainment Weekly commented, "Ultra, their first work in four years, combines up-to-the-second synth effects (courtesy of producer Tim 'Bomb the Bass' Simenon) with rippling melodies—all supported by the grim sonic architecture that long ago made DM the darlings of many a sour teen. Imposing spires of synths, industrial rivets of percussion, churchy organs, and grave vocals erect an edifice of reverent dread." Writing for The Guardian, Caroline Sullivan deemed Ultra "dark even by [Depeche Mode's] standards", and on its songs, remarked that "anyone doubting the potency of pop music should hear these, then pretend they're unshaken." Rolling Stone reviewer Elysa Gardner observed a lack of "snappy singles" on Ultra but concluded that the album's "moody, pulsating ballads" are "ideal vehicles for Gahan's brooding baritone and for the band's ever-increasing sense of tender intuition."

Los Angeles Times critic Sara Scribner was less enthusiastic, finding that Depeche Mode had not progressed musically on Ultra apart from incorporating "Simenon's emotive, multilayered, high-tech sound, which would be far better suited for a subtler band but tends to wash out any hooks on this gloom-and-doom-y album." NME James Oldham observed, "This album is at least partly the product of one of the most harrowing rock'n'roll sagas in recent memory. It's the tale of an unassuming quartet transformed into a colossal financial machine designed to bring gravitas to the masses: four cherubs from Basildon who were lauded as deities in America—only to discover they couldn't handle it... There is no dramatic reinvention, and as such we're left with an album that's every bit as flawed as its predecessors."

In a retrospective review for AllMusic, Ned Raggett stated that "Depeche delivered a strong album as a rejuvenated band" with Ultra, giving particular praise to Gahan's "new control and projection" as a vocalist. Writing for Pitchfork in 2022, Raggett described the album as "a crucial bridge between the increasing ambition of their early years and the easy confidence of their later ones."

Track listing
All lead vocals by Dave Gahan, except where noted.

2007 Collectors Edition (CD + DVD)
 Disc one is a hybrid SACD/CD with a multi-channel SACD layer.
 Disc two is a DVD which includes "Ultra" in DTS 5.1, Dolby Digital 5.1 and PCM stereo plus the following bonus material:

Additional material
 Depeche Mode 95–98 (Oh Well, That's the End of the Band...) (50-minute documentary)

Personnel
Credits adapted from the liner notes of Ultra.

Depeche Mode
 David Gahan
 Andrew Fletcher
 Martin Gore

Additional musicians
 Kerry Hopwood – programming
 Dave Clayton – keyboards, keyboard programming ; string arrangements 
 Victor Indrizzo – percussion 
 Jaki Liebezeit – percussion 
 B. J. Cole – pedal steel guitar 
 Gota Yashiki – drums 
 Keith LeBlanc – drums 
 Danny Cummings – percussion 
 Doug Wimbish – bass 
 Daniel Miller – System 700 
 Richard Niles – strings score, strings conducting 
 Graeme Perkins – strings coordination

Technical
 Tim Simenon – production, mixing
 Q – mixing, engineering
 Paul Hicks – engineering assistance
 Guy Massey – engineering assistance
 Lee Fitzgerald – engineering assistance
 Tom Rixton – engineering assistance
 Gary Forde – engineering assistance
 Lee Phillips – engineering assistance
 Jamie Campbell – engineering assistance
 Jim – engineering assistance
 Greg – engineering assistance
 Audie Chamberlain – engineering assistance
 Robbie Kazandjian – engineering assistance
 Mike Marsh – mastering at The Exchange (London)
 Evelyn Halus – vocal coach
 Gareth Jones – mixing ; additional vocals engineering

Artwork
 Anton Corbijn – art direction, photography, front cover
 Brian Dowling – colour prints
 Area – sleeve design

Charts

Weekly charts

Year-end charts

Certifications and sales

See also
 List of European number-one hits of 1997
 List of number-one albums of 1997 (Spain)
 List of UK Albums Chart number ones of the 1990s

References

External links
 
 Album information from the official Depeche Mode website
 Official remaster info

1997 albums
Albums produced by Tim Simenon
Albums recorded at Electric Lady Studios
Depeche Mode albums
Mute Records albums
Reprise Records albums